This is a list of singles that charted in the top ten of the Billboard Hot 100, an all-genre singles chart, in 2020.

Top-ten singles

Key
 – indicates single's top 10 entry was also its Hot 100 debut
 – indicates Best performing song of the year
(#) – 2020 Year-end top 10 single position and rank (Despite not reaching the top 10 on the Billboard Hot 100, peaking at #12, "The Bones" by Maren Morris reached #9 on the Year-end Hot 100 single chart of 2020.)

2019 peaks

2021 peaks

Holiday season

Notes 
Nicki Minaj was credited as a featured artist on "Say So" for the weeks ending May 16, 2020, and May 23, 2020. Prior to those two weeks, and since those two weeks, the solo version by Doja Cat has been the official listing on the Hot 100.
Beyoncé started being credited as a featured artist on "Savage" from the week ending May 16, 2020.
DaBaby, Tory Lanez and Lil Wayne started being credited as featured artists on "Whats Poppin" from the week ending July 11, 2020.
Charlie Puth started being credited as a featured artist on "I Hope" from the week ending October 3, 2020.
BTS was a credited act on "Savage Love (Laxed – Siren Beat)" for the week ending October 17, 2020, when the song reached number one, as remixes of the song figured into the song's chart points. As of the chart dated October 24, 2020, BTS is no longer credited.
A remix of Ariana Grande's "34+35" that features Doja Cat and Megan Thee Stallion helped to bring the song back into the top ten, to its peak position of number 2, on January 30, 2021, and all three artists were credited on the song that week.

The single re-entered the top ten on the week ending January 4, 2020.
The single re-entered the top ten on the week ending January 11, 2020.
The single re-entered the top ten on the week ending February 8, 2020.
The single re-entered the top ten on the week ending March 14, 2020.
The single re-entered the top ten on the week ending March 28, 2020.
The single re-entered the top ten on the week ending April 4, 2020.
The single re-entered the top ten on the week ending April 11, 2020.
The single re-entered the top ten on the week ending May 16, 2020.
The single re-entered the top ten on the week ending May 30, 2020.
The single re-entered the top ten on the week ending July 4, 2020.
The single re-entered the top ten on the week ending August 1, 2020.
The single re-entered the top ten on the week ending August 15, 2020.
The single re-entered the top ten on the week ending September 5, 2020.
The single re-entered the top ten on the week ending September 19, 2020.
The single re-entered the top ten on the week ending September 26, 2020.
The single re-entered the top ten on the week ending October 3, 2020.
The single re-entered the top ten on the week ending October 24, 2020.
The single re-entered the top ten on the week ending October 31, 2020.
The single re-entered the top ten on the week ending November 21, 2020.
The single re-entered the top ten on the week ending December 5, 2020.
The single re-entered the top ten on the week ending December 12, 2020.
The single re-entered the top ten on the week ending December 19, 2020.
The single re-entered the top ten on the week ending December 26, 2020.

See also 
 2020 in American music
 List of Billboard Hot 100 number ones of 2020

References

External links
Billboard.com
Billboard.biz
The Billboard Hot 100

United States Hot 100 Top Ten Singles
2020